Raincoat in the River is a live album by bassist and composer William Parker's Little Huey Creative Music Orchestra, which was recorded in Boston in 2001 and released on the Eremite label.

Reception

The AllMusic awarded the album 3½ stars.

Track listing
All compositions by William Parker
 "Five Rivers into One Teardrop I: Meditation for Two Voices" – 9:47   
 "Five Rivers into One Teardrop II: Mountain/Maintain" – 10:00
 "Five Rivers into One Teardrop III: Anast Crossing the Lake of Light" – 9:52   
 "Five Rivers into One Teardrop IV: Raincoat in the River" – 19:41   
 "Five Rivers into One Teardrop V: Painter's Celebration" – 9:58

Personnel
William Parker – bass, marimba, shakuhachi, bombard 
Roy Campbell, Jr. – trumpet, flugelhorn
Lewis Barnes, Richard Rodriguez – trumpet 
Masahiko Kono, Alex Lodico, Steve Swell – trombone 
Darryl Foster – tenor saxophone, soprano saxophone
Ori Kaplan, Rob Brown – alto saxophone
Charles Waters – alto saxophone, clarinet
Dave Sewelson – baritone saxophone
Dave Hofstra – tuba
Leena Conquest – vocals
Shia-Shu Yu – cello
Andrew Barker, Guillermo E. Brown – drums

References

2002 live albums
William Parker (musician) live albums
Eremite Records live albums